John Henry Thomas Leiper  (1867–1960) was an American professional baseball player who played for the Columbus Solons during the  season.

External links

Major League Baseball pitchers
Baseball players from Pennsylvania
Columbus Solons players
1867 births
1960 deaths
19th-century baseball players
Allentown (minor league baseball) players
Lancaster (minor league baseball) players
Wilmington Blue Hens players
Portland Webfeet players
Allentown Colts players
Philadelphia Colts players